Gofukumachi Station (呉服町駅) is the name of two train stations in Japan:

 Gofukumachi Station (Fukuoka)
 Gofukumachi Station (Kumamoto)